The 1927–28 Iowa State Cyclones men's basketball team (also known informally as Ames) represented Iowa State University during the 1927-28 NCAA men's basketball season. The Cyclones were coached by Bill Chandler, who was in his seventh and final season with the Cyclones. They played their home games at the State Gymnasium in Ames, Iowa.

They finished the season 3–15, 3–15 in Missouri Valley play to finish in tenth place.

Roster

Schedule and results 

|-
!colspan=6 style=""|Regular Season

|-

References 

Iowa State Cyclones men's basketball seasons
Iowa State
Iowa State Cyc
Iowa State Cyc